The Roßkopf is a  peak in the Mangfall Mountains in Upper Bavaria. It lies in the south of the district of Miesbach right on the boundary between the parishes of Schliersee in the east and Rottach-Egern in the west, which forms the watershed between the lakes of Schliersee and Tegernsee. Other peaks on this line are the Bodenschneid and the Rinnerspitz further north.

Due to its proximity to Munich, its relatively low height, easy ascents and picturesque location with views of the Spitzingsee and Tegernsee lakes, the Roßkopf is one of the most popular local mountains for Munich families. As a result, its grass-covered summit with its summit cross is often crowded on summer and autumn weekends in fine weather.

In winter the Roßkopf is a popular area for powder skiers. A new chair lift links the Roßkopf to the Spitzing ski resort.

References

Miesbach (district)
Bavarian Prealps
Mountains of Bavaria
One-thousanders of Germany
Mountains of the Alps